E3 ubiquitin-protein ligase UHRF2 is an enzyme that in humans is encoded by the UHRF2 gene.

This gene encodes a nuclear protein which is involved in cell-cycle regulation. The encoded protein is a ubiquitin-ligase capable of ubiquinating PCNP (PEST-containing nuclear protein), and together they may play a role in tumorigenesis.

References

Further reading